Cyclophora flavissima is a moth in the  family Geometridae. It is found on Borneo, the southern Moluccas and in New Guinea.

The wings have an orange-yellow ground colour. There is some variability in markings, with specimens having expanded and blackened discal spots or black streaks on the veins within the fasciae.

References

Moths described in 1907
Cyclophora (moth)
Moths of Indonesia
Moths of New Guinea